John Haselmere was mayor of Shaftesbury 1331-2 and 1351-2. He was an ancestor of MP, Thomas Haselmere.

References

Year of birth missing
14th-century deaths
Mayors of Shaftesbury
14th-century English people